= Karjalan Rugby Joensuu =

- Full name: Karjalan Rugby Joensuu
- Location: Joensuu, Finland
Team kit

Karjalan Rugby Joensuu is a Finnish rugby union club in Joensuu, Northern Karelia, and was founded in 2011. They are currently competing in the nation's Men's Div.2, the third level of rugby union in Finland. In 2018 they won the Div.2 title, but decided not to advance to Div.1.

The team also has a women's side. Recruitment of players is active for both sides.

Men's Team Placement History
Season	Level	Placement	Notes
2012	Div.1	4th	Eastern pool
2013	Div.1	3rd	National unified pool, playoff semifinalists
2014	Div.1	2nd	National unified pool
2015	Div.1	4th	National unified pool
2016	Div.1	3rd	Eastern pool
2017	Div.2	2nd	Eastern pool champions, playoff finalists
2018	Div.2	1st	Eastern pool champions, playoff winners
2019	Div.2	2nd	National unified pool, playoff finalist
